, born July 11, 1946, in Sumida, Tokyo, Japan, is a Japanese actress and singer.

Selected works
 Kaze to Kumo to Niji to (1976)
 Daitokai Tatakai no Hibi  (1976 episode, 25)
 Abunai Deka series 
 Otoko wa tsurai yo: Stage-Struck Tora-san
 Yogoreta Eiyu
 Furuhata Ninzaburo (1994 episode, 6)

Singles
 "Omaesan"
 "Unebore Waltz"
 "Izakaya"
 "Nana"

References

External links
  

1946 births
Actresses from Tokyo
Living people
Singers from Tokyo